The 1962 Cornell Big Red football team was an American football team that represented Cornell University during the 1962 NCAA University Division football season. Cornell tied for third in the Ivy League . 

In its second season under head coach Tom Harp, the team compiled a 4–5 record and was outscored 237 to 168. Tony Turel was the team captain. 

Cornell's 4–3 conference record tied for third place in the Ivy League standings. The Big Red were outscored 173 to 156 by Ivy opponents. 

Cornell played its home games at Schoellkopf Field in Ithaca, New York.

Schedule

References

Cornell
Cornell Big Red football seasons
Cornell Big Red football